The 1946 Washington Intercollegiate Conference football season was the season of college football played by the six member schools of the Washington Intercollegiate Conference (WINCO) as part of the 1946 college football season.

The Central Washington Wildcats won the WINCO championship with a 6–2 record (5–0 against conference opponents).

Conference overview

Teams

Central Washington

The 1946 Central Washington Wildcats football team represented Central Washington University of Ellensburg, Washington. In their first and only year under head coach John E. Londahl, the Wildcats compiled a 6–2 record (5–0 against WINCO opponents), outscored opponents by a total of 134 to 104, and won the WINCO championship.

Eastern Washington

The 1946 Eastern Washington Savages football team represented Eastern Washington University of Cheney, Washington. Led by head coach Red Reese, the Savages compiled a 4–3–1 record (3–1–1 against conference opponents), outscored opponents by a total of 124 to 65, and finished in second place in the WINCO.

Pacific Lutheran

The 1946 Pacific Lutheran Lutes football team represented Pacific Lutheran University of Parkland, Washington. Led by head coach Cliff Olson, the Lutes compiled a 3–3–1 record (2–2–1 against conference opponents), outscored opponents by a total of 80 to 62, and finished in third place in the WINCO.

Western Washington

The 1946 Western Washington Vikings football team represented Western Washington University of Bellingham, Washington. Led by head coach Charles Lappenbusch, the Lutes compiled a 4–4 record (2–3 against conference opponents), were outscored by a total of 96 to 92, and finished in fourth place in the WINCO.

Saint Martin's

The 1946 Saint Martin's Rangers football team represented Saint Martin's University of Lacey, Washington. Led by head coach Hal H. Chapman, the Rangers compiled a 2–4 record (1–4 against conference opponents), were outscored by a total of 79 to 65, and tied for last place in the WINCO.

Whitworth

The 1946 Whitworth Pirates football team represented Whitworth University of Spokane, Washington. Led by head coach Gerald Stannard, the Pirates compiled a 1–7 record (1–4 against conference opponents), were outscored by a total of 157 to 60, and finished in last place in the WINCO.

References